Great Rissington is a village in the Cotswold district of Gloucestershire, England. The population taken at the 2011 census was 367.

History

In the First World War, the Souls family lost 5 of their 6 children in war. The were paid a shilling a week for each dead son in compensation and later moved to Great Barrington.

The church of St John the Baptist is 12th century, with the central tower decorated with battlements and pinnacles being 15th century. The south transept was added in the 13th century and there is memorial to soldiers from the village who died in the First World War as well as a memorial to John Barnarde, who died in 1621.

Amenities
The village contains a church, St John the Baptist, a pub, called the Lamb Inn and a 17th Century manor house.

Howard baronets
In 1955, the Howard baronets of Great Rissington were created:
Sir (Harold Walter) Seymour Howard, 1st Baronet (1888–1967)
Sir Hamilton Edward de Coucey Howard, 2nd Baronet (1915–2001)
Sir David Howarth Seymour Howard, 3rd Baronet (born 1945)

Notable residents

Joan and Victor Eyles retired to Great Rissington in 1962.

Gallery

References

Villages in Gloucestershire
Cotswold District